Hafun is a town in the northeastern Bari province of Somalia. Situated in Ras Hafun on the coast of the Guardafui Channel, it is the centre of the Hafun District, and the easternmost town in continental Africa (this means that it sees the first sunrise on the African continent). It is an ancient town previously known as Opone.

History

Hafun has been identified as the ancient trading port of Opone, which was described in the 1st century CE Greek travelogue the Periplus of the Erythraean Sea. Pottery found by an expedition led by Neville Chittick, in Oponean tombs at Damo, date back to the Mycenaean kingdom of Greece that flourished during the 16th century BC. Merchants from as far afield as Indonesia and Malaysia also passed through the settlement. By 50 CE, the area was well known as a centre for the cinnamon trade, along with the bartering of cloves and other spices, ivory, exotic animal hides, and incense. It also traded in tortoiseshells.

During the early modern period, Hafun was part of the Majeerteen Sultanate's realm.

In 1930, an Italian firm invested capital to exploit salt deposits in Hafun and Hurdiyo. The Italians renamed the city Dante and created the biggest salt production plant in the world. By 1933 or 1934, the Hafun salt works were producing more than 200,000 tonnes of salt, most of which was exported to the Far East.

Following independence in 1960, the town was made the official centre of Hafun District.

Demographics
, Hafun had a population of around 13,200 inhabitants.

Education
According to the Puntland Ministry of Education, there are eight primary schools in Hafun District. Among these are Hurdiya, Laamiye, Gardush and Xandha.

Economy

The Hafun Fishing Company (HFC) was established in July 1992, in Bosaso. It was named after Hafun, where HFC also has an office. The firm exports a wide range of fish products to international markets. Among these are lobsters, frozen fish, dried shark meat and fin, which it mainly sends to Yemen, the United Arab Emirates and Oman, as well as some products to Kenya. The company is exploring additional global markets for its fish.

In late 2014, the Udug Ltd. Company, in conjunction with the United States-based REDD Engineering & Construction Incorporated, began conducting feasibility studies for the renovation of the salt production plants in Hafun, Hurdiyo, and other littoral areas in Puntland. The first phase of the initiative was completed in March 2015 and saw the historic salt works in both towns refurbished following community-wide consultations. According to the Puntland Ministry of Planning and International Cooperation, the project focuses on stimulating entrepreneurship and sustaining job creation. It was inspired by calls for national reinvestment by the Puntland presidential office and the Puntland Chamber of Commerce. Additionally, REDD Engineering official Lowry Redd indicated that the initiative's second phase aims to restore the Hafun plant to its place as one of the main global suppliers of salt.

Transportation
In 2012, the Puntland Highway Authority (PHA) announced a project to connect Hafun and other coastal towns in Puntland to the main regional highway.

See also
 Puntland
 Shell money

Notes

External links
Hafun, Somalia

Populated places in Bari, Somalia
Ancient Greek geography of East Africa